Just a Breath Away is a Canadian-French co-produced thriller film, directed by Daniel Roby and released in 2018. The film stars Romain Duris and Olga Kurylenko as Mathieu and Anna, parents trying to protect their daughter (Fantine Harduin) from a toxic gas cloud that is enveloping Paris.

The film was released in France on 4 April 2018. It screened on opening night at the Fantasia International Film Festival.

Plot
Parisian girl Sarah is one of a group of children who has a mysterious 'total allergy' auto-immune syndrome that forces them to live in hermetically-sealed capsules, while her parents, scientists Mathieu and Anna, desperately search for a cure. Soon after Mathieu returns from Canada with news of a possible breakthrough. A while later, there is an apparent earthquake, followed by the release of a deadly gas which emerges from the ground and begins to spread through the streets, killing everyone who is caught in it and inhaling the toxic fumes. Fortunately, the gas proves to be heavier than air, and Mathieu and Anna find refuge above the mist in the top-floor apartment of their elderly neighbors, Lucien and Colette.  Sarah is forced to remain in her bubble in the family's now fog-filled flat, which has now been only limited to battery power mode to keep her air filtration system operating.

By holding his breath, Mathieu breaks into the apartment one floor below, knowing the occupant uses an oxygen tank.  He takes the oxygen tank and mask from the neighbor's body and while gathering supplies, finds that the fog has killed the elder of the neighbor's dogs, though the puppy is unharmed.

After delivering the supplies to Sarah and changing her battery, Mathieu ventures onto the corpse-strewn streets.  He encounters some soldiers leading a group of survivors, all wearing gas masks and headed to Montmartre which sits above the level of the fog.  Mathieu is unwilling to leave without his family so a soldier gives him two new masks and tanks before leaving.  Upon returning to the apartment, Mathieu realises the fog is rising up slowly.

The next day, Mathieu and Anna witness riots breaking out among the survivors at Montmartre and decide to escape to the house of Sarah's friend Charlotte, who lives in the hills.  Charlotte has the same syndrome so Sarah could share her bubble.  In order to move Sarah, they travel to a laboratory to acquire a sealed suit.  They are separated when Mathieu falls into the Seine after being chased by a dog but they meet again at the laboratory.  After retrieving a suit, an explosion damages Mathieu's oxygen tube.  Sharing Anna's oxygen, they make it to an office above the fog.  Anna's oxygen is now too low for them both to return, so she returns alone with the suit while Mathieu tries to return by climbing over rooftops.  He finds a camp with a large amount of supplies.  He steals another oxygen mask and is forced to kill the camp's occupant when he catches him.

Anna makes it back to the apartment just as her oxygen runs out, then realises the suit was damaged in the explosion.  When Sarah's battery runs out, she holds her breath to run back downstairs.  Though she changes the battery successfully, she does not make it back and Mathieu returns to find her body on the stairs.

As the fog rises further and seeps into the apartment, Mathieu decides to get a hazmat suit he saw earlier in a crashed car and adapt it for Sarah, while Lucien and Colette lie on their bed and await death.
Mathieu retrieves the suit and finds a scooter.  While driving back to the apartment, he nearly runs into a boy walking without a mask and crashes, knocking himself out.  When he awakens, he is stunned to see Sarah approaching him through the fog, unaffected, with the boy.  The boy is her boyfriend Noé, who has the same condition as her and Charlotte.  He realizes that the fog is not affecting them (due to the mist having no effect on people with the same disease) and reunites with Sarah.  After embracing his daughter for the first time in 12 years, Mathieu passes out again.

Mathieu awakes to find himself in Sarah's medical capsule, their roles reversed, with Sarah now looking after him.

Cast 
Romain Duris as Mathieu
Olga Kurylenko as Anna
Fantine Harduin as Sarah
Michel Robin as Lucien
Anna Gaylor as Colette

Reception

Accolades
The film received eight nominations at the 7th Canadian Screen Awards in 2019, including for Best Motion Picture.

References

External links 
 

2018 films
2010s science fiction thriller films
Films directed by Daniel Roby
Films set in Paris
Canadian science fiction thriller films
French-language Canadian films
2010s Canadian films